Triflidic acid (IUPAC name: tris[(trifluoromethyl)sulfonyl]methane, abbreviated formula: Tf3CH) is an organic superacid.  It is one of the strongest known carbon acids and is among the strongest Brønsted acids in general, with an acidity exceeded only by the carborane acids.  Notably, triflidic acid is estimated to have an acidity 104 times that of triflic acid (pKaaq ~ –14), as measured by its acid dissociation constant.  It was first prepared in 1987 by Seppelt and Turowsky by the following route:(1)  Tf2CH2 + 2CH3MgBr → Tf2C(MgBr)2 + 2CH4   (2)  Tf2C(MgBr)2 + TfF → Tf3C(MgBr) + MgBrF (3)  Tf3C(MgBr) + H2SO4 → Tf3CH + MgBrHSO4In its anionic form, the lanthanide salts of triflidic acid ("triflides") have been shown to be more efficient Lewis acids than the corresponding triflates.  The triflide anion has also been employed as the anionic component of ionic liquids.

See also 

 Bistriflimide
 Non-coordinating anion

References

Superacids
Trifluoromethyl compounds